Washington Township is one of fifteen townships in Wayne County, Indiana, United States. As of the 2010 census, its population was 1,436 and it contained 626 housing units.

History
Washington Township was organized in 1817.

Beechwood (Isaac Kinsey House) and the Doddridge Chapel and Cemetery are listed on the National Register of Historic Places.

Geography
The streams of Brethren Run, Butlers Creek, Central Run, City Run, Common Run, Dry Branch, Franklin Creek, Greens Fork, Martindale Creek, Milton Drain, Shaker Run, Warm Run, Wilson Run and Woodclinch Brook run through this township.

Cities and towns
 Milton

Unincorporated towns
 Beesons at 
(This list is based on USGS data and may include former settlements.)

Adjacent townships
 Center Township (northeast)
 Abington Township (east)
 Waterloo Township, Fayette County (southeast)
 Harrison Township, Fayette County (southwest)
 Posey Township, Fayette County (west)
 Jackson Township (northwest)

Cemeteries
The township contains six cemeteries: Doddridge 
Chapel Cemetery, Franklin, Friends, South Side, United Brethren and West Side.

Major highways
 Indiana State Road 1

References
 U.S. Board on Geographic Names (GNIS)
 United States Census Bureau cartographic boundary files

External links
 Indiana Township Association
 United Township Association of Indiana

Townships in Wayne County, Indiana
Townships in Indiana